"The Woman at the Airport" is the tenth episode of the first season of the television series, Bones. Originally aired on January 25, 2006 on Fox network, the episode is written by Teresa Lin and directed by Greg Yaitanes. While the series takes place mostly in Washington, D.C., this episode is also set in Los Angeles, California, featuring FBI Special Agent Seeley Booth and Dr. Temperance Brennan's investigation into a woman whose remains were found at several locations in the Los Angeles International Airport.

Summary
The well preserved remains of an Iron Age specimen piques the professional interest of everyone in the lab. While Dr. Brennan and Zach start working on it, Booth brings in another case, skeletal remains of a victim that are dispersed around Los Angeles airport. Booth triumphs over Brennan's refusal to join the investigation in favor of the more scholarly forensics by dangling the attraction of a high profile Hollywood case to Brennan's superior, Dr. Goodman.

Initial investigation reveals that the bones were scattered by coyotes to everyone's mild surprise. The Special Agent in Los Angeles, Tricia Finn, pesters Brennan about the upcoming movie based on her novel and tries to promote her screenplay talents. The dead person turns out to be a high profile call girl with a penchant for plastic surgery for beautification. The pervasive bone restructuring of the face render facial reconstruction impossible. Brennan is also distressed by the culture of physical insecurity, leading to an industry of plastic surgery in the city. The circumstantial evidence points to two surgeons who operated on the dead woman. But the ending reveals that it was one of the call girl's colleagues, Leslie Snow, who murdered her out of jealousy. Meanwhile, a standoff between Dr. Hodgins and Dr. Goodman is resolved when Hodgins discovers that the intentions behind avoiding forensic investigations on the Iron Age skeleton is more out of deference to the well preserved body and less due to administrative jurisprudence.

Music
The episode featured the following music:
 Ooh La La - Goldfrapp
 Precious - Depeche Mode
 Show Your Style - Ferry Corsten
 Free Los Angeles - Baby
 I'm Slipping Away - Messy

Cultural references
 In this episode, the call girl Booth interrogated mentions the murder victim's boyfriend, Nick, had a role as a terrorist in 24, another Fox produced drama. In reality, the only credited actors with the name Nick in 24 are Nick Jameson, who portrayed a Russian president, and Nick Offerman, who portrayed a racist that was arrested.

Conception
According to the writer of the episode, Teresa Lin, the main idea of the episode is "what makes up identity" and "how we are all, to some degree, caught up in the world of youth, beauty and perception." Lin expresses that many reality television shows have illustrated that "looks can have a profound impact on what we are deemed to be worth" and "can send the wrong message". Moreover, Lin conveys the irony in the story is that the victim in the episode is murdered not because of "who she was but for who she seemed to be."

References

External links

 "The Woman at the Airport" at Fox.com
 

Bones (TV series) episodes
2006 American television episodes